Peter Shoots Down the Bird is a 1959 West German comedy film directed by Géza von Cziffra and starring Peter Alexander, Germaine Damar and Maria Sebaldt.

It was shot at the Spandau Studios in Berlin. The film's sets were designed by the art directors Paul Markwitz and Heinrich Weidemann.

Plot
Peter Schatz is a porter at a hotel where he is very popular with all the guests. However, he struggles to get along with the hotel director, who is a bit of a pedantic tyrant and feared by all staff, and switchboard lady Renate of another hotel. Beside his work he has ambitions to travel the world. When he inherits a larger sum of money from a former hotel guest in gratitude for his services to her and her dog, his colleague Mathilde suggests he could go on a ski trip into a posh ski resort in the Austrian Alps. At first his attempt to book a room in the Grand Hotel in Zürs am Arlberg is futile, as they are completely booked, so he comes up with a lie, pretending he was a Argentinian beef and cattle king to get a room.

Before he leaves, Peter drops in to the hotel director's office and tells him he needs several weeks of annual leave. The director does not want to grant these and thinks Peter has gotten crazy, so he orders an ambulance with strong carers from the local mental institution, but Peter manages to get the director mad and raging, so the director ends up in a straight jacket himself and is taken away.
In the evening Peter celebrates a farewell party with all the hotel staff and in the next morning sets off on his travels.

On holiday, he incidentally meets Renate, and falls in love with her. He soon realises who she is, although she does not for him. Afraid to anger her, he keeps the tale of the cattle king going. The disguise causes a lot of confusion. 

Peter attempts several types of winter and alpine sports, although he is very bad at them. Peter then attracts the attention of a fraudster lady residing in the neighbouring hotel room, who believe him to be very rich as well and scheme to rob him.

Cast
Peter Alexander as Peter Schatz
Germaine Damar as Renate Hartwig
Maria Sebaldt as Marilyn
Oskar Sima as Director Wilfried Adler
Ernst Waldow as General Bumm
Agnes Windeck as Rose
Anneliese Würtz as Marie
Edith Hancke as Fräulein Lehmann
Jo Herbst as Dr. Klaus Maria Weichholz
Axel Monjé as Marilyn's accomplice
Friedrich Schoenfelder as Toni Hartwig
Bob Iller as Portier Blümli
Herbert Weissbach as Mr. Pieps
Hans W. Hamacher as Lawyer Hammel
Christine von Trümbach
Ruth Stephan as Mathilde Hütchen

Soundtrack
Peter Alexander - "Ins weiße Wolkenschlößchen"
Peter Alexander - "Hol den Peter"
Peter Alexander - "Piccolo-Ponny"
Peter Alexander - "Torero der Liebe"

References

External links

1959 musical comedy films
German musical comedy films
West German films
1950s German-language films
1950s French-language films
Films set in hotels
Films set in the Alps
Skiing films
Films directed by Géza von Cziffra
Films shot at Spandau Studios
1950s English-language films
1950s German films